Phillip Brett (born 1991 or 1992) is a Unionist politician from Northern Ireland representing the Democratic Unionist Party (DUP).

Political career 
Brett was a member of Antrim and Newtownabbey Borough Council since 2014. Brett has been a Member of the Northern Ireland Assembly (MLA) for Belfast North since the 2022 election.

References 

Living people
Democratic Unionist Party MLAs
21st-century British politicians
Northern Ireland MLAs 2022–2027
Politicians from Belfast
Year of birth uncertain
Members of Antrim Borough Council
Democratic Unionist Party councillors
Year of birth missing (living people)